Elbert County is the name of two counties in the United States:

Elbert County, Colorado 
Elbert County, Georgia